Beat is the ninth studio album by the British rock band King Crimson, released in 1982 by record label E.G. This is the second King Crimson album to feature the band's line-up of co-founder Robert Fripp, Adrian Belew, Tony Levin and Bill Bruford. It is the first release in King Crimson’s discography to feature the same lineup as the previous studio album.

Background and production
According to the Trouser Press Record Guide, the album was inspired by the history and work of 1950’s Beat literature, spurred on by the twenty-fifth anniversary of the publication of On the Road by Jack Kerouac. Additionally, Belew claims he was "prompted by a note saying 'I'm wheels, I am moving wheels' by Fripp," who suggested Beat writings become the "lyrical underpinning" of the album after he saw Belew "reading Keuroac." The album makes several references to the writings of the Beat Generation:

"Neal and Jack and Me" is the track most obviously inspired by Beat writers. The 'Jack' of the title is Beat writer Jack Kerouac, while 'Neal' is Kerouac's best friend Neal Cassady. Besides On the Road, the lyrics make references in French to other significant Kerouac works; Les Souterrains, Des Visions du Cody and Sartori a Paris. The song was released as a B-side to "Heartbeat". "Heartbeat" is also the name of a book written by Neal Cassady's wife Carolyn about her experiences with the Beats. "Sartori in Tangier" derives its title from Satori in Paris and the city of Tangier in Morocco, where a number of Beat writers resided and which they often used as a setting for their writing. Writer Paul Bowles was associated with the Beats, and his novel The Sheltering Sky, which provided the title for a track on King Crimson's previous studio album, Discipline, is partly set in Tangier. Bowles's novel is further referenced on the King Crimson song "Walking On Air", from their 1995 album Thrak.

"Sartori in Tangier" is entirely instrumental, with the distinctive intro being performed by Tony Levin on the Chapman Stick. The song was first performed in 1981 with an extended introduction. "Neurotica" shares its title with Neurotica, a Beat-era magazine. The Frippertronics intro is lifted directly from the beginning of "Hååden Two" off Fripp's 1979 solo album Exposure. The song was performed in 1981 before it had finalized lyrics, and Belew introduced the instrumental as "Manhattan". "The Howler" refers to the Beat poem Howl by Allen Ginsberg, which Fripp suggested to Belew as inspiration for the lyrics. The  guitar riff heard halfway through the song can be likened to the one Belew played on the Tom Tom Club single "Genius of Love" in 1981. The song was first performed in early 1982 as an instrumental, and the ultimately unused "Absent Lovers" emerged during this time as well.

Although not an obvious reference to any Beat-related writings, "Requiem" is notable for the drama it caused within the band. It is an improvisation set to the backdrop of a Frippertronics loop from Fripp's 1979 tour. After Levin and Bruford recorded the rhythm tracks, Belew returned to the studio alone to record additional guitar overdubs. Fripp later did the same, and when the group had re-convened, Belew told Fripp to leave. Fripp, though visibly upset, complied and headed for his home in Wimborne. He was not heard from for around three days; Bruford wrote a supportive letter and the group's manager at the time, Paddy Spinks, had a phone call with Fripp. They managed to "piece it all back together" and Belew would later apologise, but the group had broken up and didn't reunite until the 1982 tour. Fripp has said this about the album's production: "At the time, Bill and Adrian thought that Beat was better than Discipline. For me, this is an indication of how far the band had already drifted from its original vision. The group broke up at the end of Beat... I had nothing to do with the mixing of Beat, nor did I feel able to promote it. Somehow we absorbed that fact, and kept going." Belew would later go on to say, "Beat was the most awful record-making experience of my life and one I would never choose to repeat." Both Belew and Bruford have said that "Heartbeat" and "Two Hands" shouldn't have been on the album. Regardless, the album was commercially successful and the group was well-received on tour.

Release and reception 

Released on 18 June 1982, Beat reached number 39 in the UK Albums Chart. Trouser Press wrote that "the players push their instruments into a new form, akin to fusion and art-rock, but miles beyond either, and beyond description as well."

A new 5.1 surround sound mix by Steven Wilson and Robert Fripp, started in 2009 and finished in 2013, was released in October 2016 for the 40th Anniversary Series as a standalone CD/DVD package and as part of the On (and off) The Road (1981 - 1984) boxed set.

Track listing 

Music by Robert Fripp, Adrian Belew, Tony Levin and Bill Bruford. Lyrics by Adrian Belew, except “Two Hands” by Margaret Belew.

Personnel
King Crimson
 Robert Fripp – guitar, electric organ, Frippertronics
 Adrian Belew – guitar, lead vocals
 Tony Levin – bass guitar, Chapman stick, backing vocals
 Bill Bruford – acoustic and electric drums and percussion

additional personnel
Rhett Davies – producer
Graham Davies – equipment
Rob O'Conner – cover design
Tex Read – social services
Patrick Spinks – management

Charts 
Album

Single

References

External links 
 Beat lyrics
 

King Crimson albums
1982 albums
E.G. Records albums
Warner Records albums
Virgin Records albums
Albums produced by Rhett Davies
New wave albums by English artists